Godfrey Dewey (September 3, 1887 – October 18, 1977)  was the president of the Lake Placid Organizing Committee and a winter sports facility designer. He was largely responsible for the successful candidature of Lake Placid for the 1932 Winter Olympics.  In addition to his role as the U.S. ski team manager he was chosen as the flag bearer for the 1928 Games in St. Moritz, Switzerland. Dewey was elected to the U.S. National Ski Hall of Fame in 1970.

Godfrey Dewey was the son of Melvil Dewey, the inventor of Dewey Decimal Classification, and his first wife Annie Godfrey.  He went on to become the honorary chairman of the Phonemic Spelling Council. His work on World English Spelling may have influenced the development of SoundSpel, as he and Edward Rondthaler corresponded from 1971.

References

1887 births
1977 deaths
Sportspeople from New York City
Harvard University alumni